Copepteryx is an extinct genus of flightless bird of the family Plotopteridae, endemic to Japan during the Oligocene living from 28.4 to 23 mya, meaning it existed for approximately .

Taxonomy

Copepteryx was named by Olson and Hasegawa in 1996. Its type is Copepteryx hexeris. It was assigned to Plotopteridae by Olson and Hasegawa in 1996.

The name is derived from the Ancient Greek words Kope and pteryx meaning oar wing. The apparent reference to the 19th Century paleontologist Edward Drinker Cope is accidental.

Copepteryx was a diving plotopterid bird which is similar to the Waimanu.

Description

The bird was aquatic and likely ate fish and squid as well as shellfish. It is unknown if it had any predators.

References

 Biology of Marine Birds (Marine Biology) by E. A. Schreiber and Joanna Burger

Fossil taxa described in 1996
Oligocene birds of Asia
Plotopteridae